Crocombe is a surname. Notable people include:

 Avis Crocombe (1838–1927), British cookery writer 
 Ron Crocombe (1929–2009), professor of pacific studies at the University of the South Pacific
 Max Crocombe (born 1993), New Zealand footballer
 Juli Crocombe, consultant psychiatrist
 Marjorie Crocombe (born 1950), author and academic from the Cook Islands